Teliphasa is a genus of snout moths. It was erected by Frederic Moore in 1888.

Species
 Teliphasa albifusa (Hampson, 1896)
 Teliphasa amica (Bulter, 1879)
 Teliphasa andrianalis Viette, 1960
 Teliphasa dibelana Ghesquière, 1942
 Teliphasa elegans (Butler, 1881)
 Teliphasa erythrina Li, 2016
 Teliphasa hamata Li, 2016
 Teliphasa lophotalis (Hampson, 1900)
 Teliphasa nubilosa Moore, 1888
 Teliphasa orbiculifer Moore, 1888
 Teliphasa sakishimensis Inoue & Yamanaka, 1975
 Teliphasa similalbifusa Li, 2016
 Teliphasa spinosa Li, 2016

References

Epipaschiinae
Pyralidae genera